The North American Broadcasters Association (NABA) is a non-profit group of broadcasting organizations in the United States, Canada and Mexico.  It is "committed to advancing the interests of broadcasters at home and internationally."

As a member of the World Broadcasting Unions, NABA "creates the opportunity for North American broadcasters to share information, identify common interests and reach consensus on international issues." NABA also provides representation for North American broadcasters in global forums on topics including protection of content, spectrum related concerns, the territorial integrity of broadcasters’ signals and digital transition issues.

NABA's full members, who represent network broadcasters both public and private, work together with their colleagues including national broadcasting associations, speciality services, service providers and vendors to provide a common voice for the North American broadcast community.

NABA Annual General Meeting (AGM) and Conference
Each year, NABA holds a Conference & Annual General Meeting (AGM). This event provides members with the opportunity to gather in one place to discuss important issues in official meetings and through conference panels. NABA members host each event at their facilities, with the most recent AGMs taking place at CNN (Atlanta), Fox (Los Angeles), CBC/Radio-Canada (Toronto), NBC-Universal (New York), Televisa/TV Azteca (Mexico City) and NPR (Washington, DC).

Full Members
Bell Media
Canadian Broadcasting Corporation
Walt Disney Television
Fox Corporation
NBCUniversal
Paramount Global
Televisa

Associate Members
NPR
PBS
Imagen Televisión
Corus Entertainment
Sinclair Broadcast Group

References

External links
 NABA Official site

Professional associations based in Canada
Television organizations in the United States
Television organizations in Canada
Organizations based in Toronto